Muzaik is the revised edition of the Danish dance duo Infernals second studio album Waiting for Daylight. The album was a re-release of the Waiting for Daylight album with more pop-oriented versions of the previously released songs and a few new tracks and new artwork. The band has later stated that this is the issue they intended to put out to begin with.

The album contains the hit singles "Serengeti", "Sunrise" and "Muzaik" from the previous album, which all charted within the top 20 of the Danish Singles Chart, except for "Serengeti". Two singles were released from this album: "You Receive Me" and "Let Me Hear You Say Yeah", with the first being the theme song to the second season of the reality television show Big Brother Denmark.

Track listing

Charts

References

External links
Muzaik at Discogs

Infernal (Danish band) albums
2001 albums